Highway is a 1944 play by American playwright Sophie Treadwell.

References

Plays by Sophie Treadwell
1944 plays